Joy is a village in Mercer County, Illinois, United States. The population was 372 as of the 2020 census.

The origin of the name: "Joy" was named when founded in 1869 after the president of the Chicago, Burlington and Quincy Railroad, J. F. Joy.

Geography
Joy is located in western Mercer County at  (41.196923, -90.879702). Illinois Route 17 passes through the village on Center Street, leading east  to Aledo, the county seat, and west the same distance to its terminus in New Boston, on the Mississippi River.

The village drains east to a north-flowing tributary of the Edwards River, a west-flowing tributary of the Mississippi River; and west to headwaters of the Mud River, part of the Pope Creek watershed flowing southwest to the Mississippi.

Demographics

At the 2000 census, there were 373 people, 156 households and 104 families residing in the village. The racial makeup of the village was 99.46% White, and 0.54% from two or more races. Hispanic or Latino of any race were 1.07% of the population.

There were 156 households, of which 32.1% had children under the age of 18 living with them, 54.5% were married couples living together, 9.6% had a female householder with no husband present, and 33.3% were non-families. 29.5% of all households were made up of individuals, and 13.5% had someone living alone who was 65 years of age or older. The average household size was 2.39 and the average family size was 2.96.

26.5% of the population were under the age of 18, 9.7% from 18 to 24, 27.3% from 25 to 44, 20.9% from 45 to 64, and 15.5% who were 65 years of age or older. The median age was 35 years. For every 100 females, there were 92.3 males. For every 100 females age 18 and over, there were 91.6 males.

The median household income was $36,625 and the median family income was $39,722. Males had a median income of $32,232 versus $25,500 for females. The per capita income was $14,201. About 12.7% of families and 18.6% of the population were below the poverty line, including 26.9% of those under age 18 and 4.3% of those age 65 or over.

Schools
Mercer County Junior High School is located in Joy, in the building that once housed the now defunct Westmer High School.

References

External links

Westmer Community Unit School District 203
"Holiday Postmark Returns to Joy, Illinois," WQAD-8 Quad Cities Television, December 1, 2014

Villages in Mercer County, Illinois
Villages in Illinois